The 1912 United States presidential election in Tennessee took place on November 5, 1912, as part of the 1912 United States presidential election. Tennessee voters chose twelve representatives, or electors, to the Electoral College, who voted for president and vice president.

Tennessee was won by Princeton University President Woodrow Wilson (D–Virginia), running with governor of Indiana Thomas R. Marshall, with 52.80% of the popular vote, against the 27th president of the United States William Howard Taft (R–Ohio), running with Columbia University President Nicholas Murray Butler, with 24.00% of the popular vote, the 26th president of the United States Theodore Roosevelt (P–New York), running with governor of California Hiram Johnson, with 21.45% of the popular vote and the five-time candidate of the Socialist Party of America for President of the United States Eugene V. Debs (S–Indiana), running with the first Socialist mayor of a major city in the United States Emil Seidel, with 1.41% of the popular vote.

, this is the last election in which Hawkins County voted for a Democratic presidential candidate, as well as the last election in which Blount County, Washington County, Sevier County, Carter County, Jefferson County, Henderson County, Grainger County, Scott County, Unicoi County, and Johnson County did not vote for the Republican candidate.

Results

Results by county

Notes

References

Tennessee
1912
1912 Tennessee elections